Emil Thoroddsen (16 June 1898 – 7 July 1944) was an Icelandic composer, pianist, playwright, critic and translator. He was the chief art critic of "Morgunblaðið" newspaper from 1926–1933 and worked for the Icelandic National Broadcasting Service since its establishment in 1930. Among his most widely known songs are „Íslands Hrafnistumenn“ and „Hver á sér fegra föðurland“ which was premiered at the Festival of the Republic in 1944, shortly before he far too prematurely died from pneumonia.

In his youth, Emil practiced sports among young men from his neighborhood and was involved in the creation of the football club Víkingur Reykjavik at the age of twelve, hosting the club's inaugural meeting and initially taking the role of club secretary. He later produced coverage about the club's operations and achievements.

References

1898 births
1944 deaths
Icelandic composers
Icelandic male musicians
Icelandic dramatists and playwrights
Icelandic translators
Art critics
Deaths from pneumonia in Iceland
20th-century composers
20th-century dramatists and playwrights
20th-century translators
20th-century male musicians